The twentieth season of the reality show singing competition American Idol premiered on February 27, 2022, on the ABC television network. It is the fifth season to air on ABC since the series' revival. Ryan Seacrest returned as host, and Katy Perry, Luke Bryan and Lionel Richie returned as judges. Bobby Bones did not return as in-house mentor.

Noah Thompson from Louisa, Kentucky, won the season on May 22, 2022, while HunterGirl was the runner-up, and Leah Marlene finished in third place. Thompson was also the second consecutive male country artist to have won following Chayce Beckham the previous season. It was also the first season in the ABC era where the runner-up was a female contestant. This season also featured an all-country Top 2, the first time since season 10.

Auditions 
Due to the COVID-19 pandemic in the United States, the Idol Across America virtual auditions program returned from last season. The remote auditions took place from August 5 to October 28, 2021, as well as a number of open-call auditions, and from these, the producers selected the contestants who can then audition in front of the judges.

American Idol introduced the "platinum ticket" during the audition round in celebration of the show's twentieth season. A total of three platinum tickets were awarded and gave the recipients the opportunity to advance directly to the second round of Hollywood Week and choose their partners for that week's Duet Challenge before the remaining contestants were paired. The platinum ticket recipients were HunterGirl, Kenedi Anderson, and Jay.

Hollywood Week 
Hollywood Week was filmed December 6–9, 2021, at the Orpheum Theatre in Los Angeles, California. The Genre and Duet Challenges from the last two seasons return. In the Genre Challenge, contestants chose groups based on a specific genre and were mentored by a former Idol alum: season 10 runner-up Lauren Alaina (Country), season 2 winner Ruben Studdard (R&B), season 9 winner Lee DeWyze (Indie folk), season 10 finalist Haley Reinhart (Soul), season 7 winner David Cook (Rock), and season 6 winner Jordin Sparks (Pop). After all the contestants in their respective groups performed, the judges brought them to the stage and made their decisions. Those who advanced moved onto the Duet Challenge. After the platinum ticket holders chose their duet partners, the judges paired the remaining contestants. The duets were given twelve hours to rehearse, which included a consultation with a vocal coach, a stage rehearsal, and a session for advice from one of the judges. Those who passed the Duet Challenge advanced to the Showstopper Round.

Showstopper Round 
The Showstopper Round aired on April 4, featuring the top fifty-nine (thirty-three aired) performing for the judges and a live audience at the Orpheum Theatre. The following day, the judges narrowed the number of contestants down to twenty-four in the Final Judgment. The following is a list of the contestants who performed, the song they performed at the Showstopper, and if they advanced or not.

Color key:

Top 24 
The Top 24 contestants were split into two groups of twelve and performed at Aulani resort in Kapolei, Hawaii. Pre-recorded performances of the first group aired on April 10 and the second group on April 11. Jimmie Allen served as a guest mentor for the first group and Bebe Rexha for the second group.

Color key:

Top 20 (April 17 and 18) 
The Top 20 performances were taped on April 12, 2022, and aired on Sunday, April 17, followed by the live results on Monday, April 18.

Color key:

Live shows 
Color key:

Week 1: Top 14 – Breakout Hits / Top 11 – Judge's Song Contest (April 24 and 25) 
The Top 14 performed breakout hits on Sunday, April 24, 2022. Gabby Barrett served as a guest mentor. The judges picked songs for each of the Top 11 to perform, without knowing who chose it until after performing. Katy and Luke tied with the most songs selected and saved one contestant from elimination.

Week 2: Top 10 – Disney Night (May 1) 
The Top 10 performed Disney songs. Derek Hough served as a guest mentor.

Week 3: Top 7 – TikTok/Mother's Day Dedication (May 8) 
The Top 7 performed songs that either they've posted or went viral on TikTok and songs dedicated to their mothers or grandmothers. will.i.am served as a guest mentor.

Week 4: Top 5 – Carrie Underwood/Contestant's Choice (May 15) 
The Top 5 performed Carrie Underwood songs and a song of their choice. Underwood served as a guest mentor.

Week 5: Finale – Bruce Springsteen/Artist Singles/Reprise Songs (May 22) 
The Top 3 performed songs by Bruce Springsteen, their winner's singles and a reprise of their favorite performance of the season.

Color key:

Elimination Chart 
Color key

Ratings

Notes

References

External links 
 

American Idol seasons
2022 American television seasons